Henry Foley, S.J. (9 August 1811 – 19 November 1891) was an English Jesuit Roman Catholic church historian.

Biography
He was born at Astley in Worcestershire, England on 9 August 1811. His father was the Protestant curate in charge at Astley. After his early education at home and at a private school at Woodchester, Henry was articled to a firm of solicitors in Worcester, and in the course of time practised as a solicitor, at first in partnership with another, then by himself.

Under the influence of the Oxford Movement he was led to embrace the Catholic faith in 1846, and five years later, on the death of his wife Anne, daughter of John Vezard of Gloucestershire, he sought admission as a lay brother into the Society of Jesus. Urged to enter as a scholastic and to prepare for the priesthood, he said it was Our Lady's wish that he should be a lay brother. For thirty years he occupied the post of lay brother socius to the English provincial superior.

During that time he produced his gigantic work, The Records of the English Province of the Society of Jesus (eight octavo volumes), a compilation of immense labour and original research and an invaluable store of historical detail put together with a persevering assiduity rarely found even in the most painstaking of historians. Brother Foley deserves to share with Father Henry More the title of historian of the Society. He also wrote Jesuits in Conflict, a work describing the sufferings of some of the English Jesuit confessors of the Faith.

As a religious, Brother Foley was a model of every virtue. His bodily austerities were remarkable, while his spirit of prayer led him at all free moments to the chapel.

He died at Manresa House, Roehampton, on 19 November 1891.

Works
 Jesuits in Conflict. London: Burns and Oates (1873)
 Records of the English Province of the Society of Jesus, Vol. I. London: Burns and Oates (1877)
 Records of the English Province of the Society of Jesus, Vol. II. London: Manresa Press (1875)
 Records of the English Province of the Society of Jesus, Vol. III. London: Burns and Oates (1878)

Sources
 "Henry Foley" article by Peter Chandlery.

1811 births
1891 deaths
19th-century English Jesuits
Historians of Jesuit history
British historians of religion